Coleophora ciconiella is a moth of the family Coleophoridae. It is found from Germany to the Iberian Peninsula, Italy and Bulgaria.

The larvae feed on Avena sativa and Triticum species. They create a grey to blackish-brown, squat, trivalved, tubular silken case. The mouth angle is about 90°. Larvae can be found from October to June.

References

ciconiella
Moths described in 1855
Moths of Europe